The Hughes Conoco Service Station, at 400 SW. Taylor St. in Topeka, Kansas, was listed on the National Register of Historic Places in 2011.

It was built in 1930.

It includes elements of Tudor Revival and other Late 19th and 20th Century Revivals architectural styling.

See also 
 Continental Oil Company Building: NRHP-listed Conoco bulk storage complex in Cheyenne, Wyoming
 Continental Oil Company Filling Station: NRHP-listed Conoco gas station in Kalispell, Montana
 Huning Highlands Conoco Service Station: NRHP-listed Conoco gas station in Albuquerque, New Mexico
 Jackson Conoco Service Station: NRHP-listed Conoco gas station in El Reno, Oklahoma
 Rainbow Conoco: NRHP-listed Conoco gas station in Shelby, Montana
 Spraker Service Station: NRHP-listed Conoco gas station in Vinita, Oklahoma

References

Gas stations on the National Register of Historic Places in Kansas
National Register of Historic Places in Shawnee County, Kansas

Tudor Revival architecture in the United States
ConocoPhillips
Energy infrastructure completed in 1930